Education for Death: The Making of the Nazi is an animated propaganda short film produced by Walt Disney Productions and released on January 15, 1943, by RKO Radio Pictures, directed by Clyde Geronimi and principally animated by Milt Kahl, Ward Kimball, Frank Thomas, and Bill Tytla. The short is based on the non-fiction book of the same name by American author Gregor Ziemer. The film features the story of Hans, a boy born and raised in Nazi Germany, his indoctrination in the Hitlerjugend, and his eventual march to war.

Plot

 
At the beginning of the film, a German couple proves to a Nazi German supreme judge that they are of pure Aryan blood and agree to give their son, whom they name Hans at the judge's approval, as it is not on a list of banned names, into the service of Der Fuehrer Adolf Hitler and the Nazi Party. They are given a copy of Mein Kampf by the judge as a reward for their service to Hitler; their passport contains spaces for 12 more children (a hint that the couple is expected to produce a large family for the Fatherland).

This is followed by the only extended comical section of the cartoon, the tone of which is very light compared to the rest of the film. The audience is told that as Hans grows up, he hears a distorted version of Sleeping Beauty depicting Hitler as the knightly prince character rescuing an obese Valkyrie representing Germany, from a wicked witch representing democracy. (The narrator sarcastically comments that "the moral of this story seems to be that Hitler got Germany on her feet, climbed onto the saddle, and took her for a ride.") Thanks to this kind of distorted children's story, Hans becomes fascinated with Hitler as he and the rest of the younger members of the Hitler Youth give the Hitler salute to a portrait of Hitler dressed as a knight.

In the following segment, the audience sees Hans sick and bedridden. His mother prays for him, knowing that it will only be a matter of time before the authorities come and take him away to a death camp. A Nazi officer bangs on the door to take Hans away, but his mother says he is sick and needs care. The officer orders her to heal her son quickly and have him ready to leave, implying that if Hans does not get well, he will be euthanized. He orders her not to do anything more to him that will cause him to lose heart and be weak, explaining that a soldier must show no emotion, mercy, or feelings whatsoever.

Hans eventually recovers and resumes his "education" in a school classroom, where Hans and the rest of his classmates, all in Hitlerjugend uniforms, give the Hitler salute to portraits of Hitler, Hermann Goering, and Joseph Goebbels. They then watch as the teacher draws a cartoon on the blackboard of a rabbit being eaten by a fox, prompting Hans to feel sorry for the rabbit. The teacher, furious over the remark, orders Hans to sit in the corner wearing a dunce cap, calling him "Dummkopf" (German for "stupid" or "feeble-minded") with his classmates laughing at him. As Hans sits in the corner, he hears the rest of the classmates "correctly" interpret the cartoon as "weakness has no place in a soldier" and "the strong shall rule the weak", as the teacher asked what does Hans think about the rabbit now, causing him to recant his remark and agree that the weak must be destroyed, much to the teacher's approval.

Hans then takes part in a book-burning crusade, burning any books with ideas opposed to Hitler's (Albert Einstein, Baruch Spinoza, and Voltaire), replacing the Bible with Mein Kampf and the crucifix with a Nazi sword. Hans then spends the next several years "Marching and heiling, heiling and marching!". He reaches his teens (wearing a uniform similar to that of the Sturmabteilung) still "marching and heiling" until he becomes an adult or "Good Nazi" (now in Wehrmacht uniform) embroiled in hatred towards anyone else who opposes Hitler. With "no seed of laughter, hope, tolerance, or mercy" planted in him, he "sees no more than the party wants him to [see], says nothing but what the party wants him to say, and he does nothing except what the party wants him to do."

In the end, Hans and the rest of the German soldiers march off to war only to fade into rows of identical graves, with nothing on them except a swastika and a helmet perched on top. Thus Hans's education is complete – "his education... for death."

Production
Education for Death: The Making of the Nazi was released when Disney was under government contract to produce 32 animated shorts from 1941 to 1945. In 1940, Walt Disney spent four times his budget on the feature film Fantasia (1940) which suffered from low box office turnout. Nearing bankruptcy and with half of his employees on strike, Walt Disney was forced to look for a solution to bring money into the studio. The studio's close proximity to the military aircraft manufacturer, Lockheed, helped foster a U.S. government contract for 32 short propaganda films at $4,500 each. This saved the company from bankruptcy and allowed them to keep their employees on payroll.

The dialogue of the characters is in German, neither subtitled nor directly translated by Art Smith's lone English language narration. A voice track of Adolf Hitler in full demagogic rant is used in a torchlight rally scene. A sequence follows in which Hans becomes a German soldier along with other Hitler Youth.

Home media
The short was released on May 18, 2004, on Walt Disney Treasures: Walt Disney on the Front Lines.

Relationship to the Ziemer book
Gregor Ziemer, an American author and educator who lived in Germany from 1928 to 1939, wrote the book Education for Death after fleeing Germany on the eve of World War II. The book highlights what was going on in the Nazi schooling of the German youth.

The narrative story focuses around a group of youth that under the guidance of a Nazi storm trooper, Franzen, take a hiking trip into the woods. As night falls, Franzen "lectures the troop on their duty to preserve the purity of the human race, and proposes they symbolize this task with a solemn ritual to 'impress on us all that fire and destruction will be the end of those who do not think as we do.'" Franzen then hands out six books: the Talmud, the Koran, the works of Shakespeare, the Treaty of Versailles, a biography of Joseph Stalin, and the Bible. The books are passed around the circle and each boy spits on the books, hands them back to Franzen who douses them with kerosene and lights them on fire. The troop then sings the "Deutschlandlied" ("Deutschland, Deutschland über alles") and the Horst Wessel anthem around the fire.

The book inspired two different adaptations; Education for Death and Hitler's Children. The former took Ziemer's conclusions very seriously, as it showed the education of Hans from an innocent, kind youth into a chained and muzzled Nazi drone. The scene of the storm trooper and the hiking trip is transplanted to a classroom where the teacher instructs the students about nature's laws about the strong fox having the right to kill the weak rabbit. When Hans does not agree with the teacher, he is punished until he falls in line. The scene involving the book burning is part of the ending compilation of Nazi transformation and destruction. It shows a torch-bearing crowd setting fire to a pile of books of John Milton, Baruch Spinoza, Albert Einstein, Voltaire, and Thomas Mann. It then shows a burning of Felix Mendelssohn's wedding march, an allusion to the Nazi race laws, and the burning of a pile of art.

See also
 Walt Disney's World War II propaganda production
 American propaganda during World War II
 Der Fuehrer's Face
Don't Be a Sucker
 List of World War II short films

References

External links
 
 Video at C-SPAN website
 
 
 

1943 films
1943 animated films
1940s Disney animated short films
1940s English-language films
1940s German-language films
American animated short films
Cultural depictions of Adolf Hitler
Cultural depictions of Hermann Göring
Cultural depictions of Joseph Goebbels
American World War II propaganda shorts
Articles containing video clips
Films about Nazi Germany
Films based on non-fiction books
Films directed by Clyde Geronimi
Films produced by Walt Disney
Films scored by Oliver Wallace
Disney educational films
1940s educational films